Hawulti-Melazo (Hawelti-Melazo) is a pre-Aksumite and Aksumite archaeological site located in Eritrea. It contains various old funerary monuments, as well as ancient inscriptions.

See also
Ezana Stone
Qohaito
Hawulti (monument)

References

Tigray Region
Former populated places in Ethiopia